Wijesuriya is a Sinhalese surname that may refer to
Gemunu Wijesuriya (1934–2007), Sri Lankan broadcaster, comedian, singer and radio producer 
Glucka Wijesuriya (born 1957), Sri Lankan-born English cricketer 
Premawathie Manamperi (1949–1971), Sri Lankan Kataragama beauty queen
Roger Wijesuriya (born 1960), Sri Lankan cricketer 
Suneetha Wijesuriya, Sri Lankan chess player

Sinhalese surnames